The International Prize in Statistics is awarded every two years to an individual or team "for major achievements using statistics to advance science, technology and human welfare". The International Prize in Statistics, along with the COPSS Presidents' Award, are the two highest honours in the field of Statistics. 

The prize is modelled after the Nobel prizes, Abel Prize, Fields Medal and Turing Award and comes with a monetary award of $80,000. The award ceremony takes place during the World Statistics Congress.

Laureates

Rules
The prize recognizes a single work or body of work, representing a powerful and original idea that had an impact in other disciplines or a practical effect on the world. The recipient must be alive when the prize is awarded.

Organization
The prize is awarded by the International Prize in Statistics Foundation, which comprises representatives of the following major learned societies:
 American Statistical Association
 International Biometric Society
 Institute of Mathematical Statistics
 International Statistical Institute
 Royal Statistical Society

In addition to recognizing the contributions of a statistician, the Foundation also aims at educating the public about statistical innovations and their impact on the world and gaining wider recognition for the field.

The recipient of the prize is chosen by a selection committee comprising international experts in the field. , the committee members were Xiao-Li Meng (Harvard University), Sally Morton (Virginia Tech), Stephen Senn (Luxembourg Institute of Health), Bernard Silverman (University of Oxford), Stephen Stigler (University of Chicago),  Susan Wilson (Australian National University) and Bin Yu (University of California, Berkeley). As of May 2022, the members of the selection committee are Yoav Benjamini, Francisco Cribari-Neto, Vijay Nair, Sonia Petrone, Nancy Reid, Sylvia Richardson, and Jane-Ling Wang.

See also

 List of mathematics awards 
 Rousseeuw Prize for Statistics

References

External links
 

Statistical awards
International awards
Awards established in 2016